British actress Dame Emma Thompson has appeared in many films, television programmes and stage productions. She has won and been nominated for many awards during her career, including five Academy Award nominations (winning two), nine Golden Globe Award nominations (winning two), seven BAFTA Award nominations (winning three), and six Emmy Award nominations (winning one).

She first came to prominence in 1987 in two BBC TV series, Tutti Frutti and Fortunes of War, winning the BAFTA TV Award for Best Actress for her work in both series. Her first film role was in the 1989 romantic comedy The Tall Guy, and in the early 1990s, she and her then husband, actor and director Kenneth Branagh  co-starred in several films, including Dead Again (1991) and Much Ado About Nothing (1993).

In 1992, Thompson won an Academy Award and a BAFTA Award for Best Actress for the period drama Howards End. In 1993, she garnered dual Academy Award nominations for her roles in The Remains of the Day as the housekeeper of a grand household and In the Name of the Father as a lawyer. Thompson scripted and starred in Sense and Sensibility (1995), which earned her numerous awards. In 2013, she received acclaim and several award nominations for her portrayal of author P. L. Travers in Saving Mr. Banks. Other notable film and television credits include the Harry Potter film series (2004–2011), Wit (2001), Love Actually (2003), Angels in America (2003), Nanny McPhee (2005), Stranger than Fiction (2006), Last Chance Harvey (2008), Men in Black 3 (2012), Brave (2012), A Walk in the Woods (2015), Bridget Jones's Baby (2016), Beauty and the Beast (2017), Late Night (2019), Years and Years directed & written by Russell Davies (2019) and Cruella (2021).

Film

Television

Theatre

References

Actress filmographies
Filmography
British filmographies